Concert At Sea is a pop festival in the Netherlands held every summer (end of June) on the Brouwersdam in the province of Zeeland. It was initiated by the popular Dutch band BLØF. The name of the festival is a mistranslation of the Dutch phrase aan zee meaning by the sea / at the seaside. It is not actually held at sea. The first edition was in 2006, after a free pilot concert at that location had proved to be very successful in 2003. The first few editions of the event were one day, but from 2008 on the festival is a two-day festival that attracts 40,000 people a day.
The 2011 edition started off fine, but the second day was cancelled due to heavy storm.

References

Music festivals in the Netherlands
Music in Zeeland
Tourist attractions in Zeeland
Schouwen-Duiveland
Recurring events established in 2006
2006 establishments in the Netherlands